Gitmo is the Guantanamo Bay Naval Base, a US naval base.

Gitmo may also refer to:

 Guantánamo Bay, a bay at the southeastern end of Cuba
 Guantanamo Bay detention camp, in the Guantánamo Bay Naval Base
 Gitmo: The New Rules of War, a documentary film about the detention camp

See also
 Good Morning Gitmo, a one-act dark comedy about the detention camp
 Guantanamo (disambiguation)